Diego Soto Valera (died 1549) was a Roman Catholic prelate who served as Bishop of Mondoñedo (1545–1549).

Biography
Diego Soto Valera was born in Spain. On 27 Nov 1545, he was appointed during the papacy of Pope Paul III as Bishop of Mondoñedo.
He served as Bishop of Mondoñedo until his death on 21 Aug 1549.

References 

16th-century Roman Catholic bishops in Spain
Bishops appointed by Pope Paul III
1549 deaths